The 1977 Orient Cup was a men's tennis tournament played on outdoor clay courts in Bogotá, Colombia that was part of the one star category of the 1977 Colgate-Palmolive Grand Prix. It was the inaugural edition of the tournament and was held from 7 November through 13 November 1977. First-seeded Guillermo Vilas won the singles title.

Finals

Singles
 Guillermo Vilas defeated  José Higueras 6–2, 6–0
 It was Vilas' 13th singles title of the year and the 32nd of his career.

Doubles
 Belus Prajoux /  Hans Gildemeister defeated  Jorge Andrew /  Carlos Kirmayr 6–4, 6–2

References

External links
 ITF tournament edition details

Orient Cup
Orient Cup